Erinpura may refer to:

 Erinpura, a village in the Sirohi district of Rajasthan, India
 Arenpura, a village in the Pali district of Rajasthan, India
 SS Erinpura, a ship of the British-India Steam Navigation Company
 Erinpura Granite: a type of Granite
 43rd Erinpura Regiment, regiment of the British Indian Army